Lux-Post is a free weekly newspaper published in Luxembourg.  It is published by Editpress.  Lux-Post has the largest circulation of any newspaper in the country, with over 135,000 copies distributed a week.

External links
 Lux-Post official website

Weekly newspapers published in Luxembourg
French-language newspapers published in Luxembourg
German-language newspapers published in Luxembourg
Free daily newspapers